The Battle of Camaret, also referred to as the Brest expedition, was a notable engagement of the Nine Years' War. Expecting Brest to be unguarded as the French fleet stationed there sailed south to face the Spanish, an amphibious operation at Camaret Bay was launched on 18 June 1694 by a 10,000 to 12,000-strong Anglo-Dutch force in an attempt to take and occupy the city, which represented one of the most important French naval bases. The French, however, were well aware of their plan. 

The expedition was opposed by only a bit over thousand French troops led by Sébastien Le Prestre de Vauban, in his only ever field command. Consisting of fierce exchanges of fire involving Anglo-Dutch ships and French cannons as well as a ground engagement which saw an allied landing party be repulsed back to the sea after a French counter-attack, the battle resulted in a prompt defeat for the Allies and their retreat.

Context
At the start of 1694, Louis XIV decided to take the fight to the Mediterranean and Spain. Aiming to support Maréchal de Noailles in the capture of Barcelona and to force Spain to sign a peace treaty, Tourville sailed out of Brest on 24 April with 71 ships of the line and Chateaurenault's squadron followed him on 7 May. Informed of this fact, the English and Dutch planned to take Brest, thinking that this would be easy in the absence of Tourville and his fleet, and to land a strong army of occupation there of 7,000 to 8,000 men.

After Tourville's victory at Lagos in 1693, William III of England had sent an expedition to take reprisals against Saint-Malo and planned to mount other similar operations against other French ports. Having got wind of the plan against Brest via spies, Louis XIV made Vauban military commander of Brest and the four lower-Breton dioceses, from Concarneau to Saint-Brieuc.

Preparations
A fleet was assembled in Portsmouth under command of Admiral Berkeley, consisting of 36 warships, 12 fireships, 80 transport ships (carrying around 8,000 soldiers), with a total force of over 10,000 men, under the command of general Thomas Tollemache.

Vauban started immediately to organize the defence of the city and the rocky coast around it. The bad weather kept the English fleet in its harbour for a month, giving the French just enough time to prepare a warm reception.

General preparations

In fact, in 1685, well before the start of the Nine Years' War, Louis XIV had charged Vauban with inspecting the coast from Dunkirk to Bayonne. Of his first stay at Camaret, Vauban wrote in his memoir of 9 May 1685: 

Just after the war began and, having inspected the sites already, he decided first to set up a defensive position at Bertheaume and to build a "tour de côte" at Camaret, the unique example of its type. Vauban's first designs foresaw the building of a round tower, but once he arrived he decided to make it a polygonal tower. While work on the tour de Camaret began in 1689, and forewarned by their spies and realising the importance of the works, the English wished to destroy the building. When in 1691 sixteen Anglo-Dutch vessels were sighted in Camaret Bay, five French frigates happened to be present and routed the enemy fleet. Due to the fallible means at their disposal for the defence of a space covering several hundred kilometres of coast (a few hundred miles), Vauban decided to set up forts in several places, maintained by militia forces but able to be quickly reinforced by regular troops stationed in the rear.

Preparations for the attack

At the start of 1694, having got wind of Tourville leaving Brest with 53 ships of the line, William III believed Brest would be easily taken and decided to launch his attack on it. As the historian Prosper Levot writes, this attack

William III's plan was to have the majority of the Anglo-Dutch fleet, under the orders of admiral Russell, sail towards Barcelona to fight Tourville and to have the rest of it, under the orders of John Berkeley, land an invasion force (under lieutenant-general Thomas Tollemache) at or near Brest and take control of the Goulet and roadstead of Brest. The English that Brest's fate mainly depended on control of the goulet, remembering the 1594 attempt on Brest (in which a Spanish force of only 400 had held off over 6,000 troops under John VI of Aumont for over a month in the siege of Crozon.

In the face of more and more precise English threats, Louis XIV made Vauban "supreme commander of all French land and sea forces in the province of Brittany". Vauban had already been lieutenant-général des Armées since 1688 and accepted the new post on one condition: that he would not be "honorary [i.e. unpaid] lieutenant-general of the Navy". The statement on the fortifications by the engineers Traverse and Mollart, dating to 23 April 1694, showed only 265 cannon and 17 mortars. When Vauban received the royal directives at the start of May, Brest was defended by a garrison of around 1,300 men. Arriving in Brest on 23 May, Vauban knew the odds were not in his favour, even in the scenario in which the expected last minute reinforcements consisting of a cavalry regiment, a dragoon regiment and 6 infantry battalions would manage to be there on time.

After the preparations made in Portsmouth, the allied fleet sailed on June 1, 1694. During this time, Vauban multiplied the construction of fortified positions along the coast and reinforced those already in existence.. In mid-June he inspected the defences under his command and noted that the baie de Douarnenez and above all Camaret would allow landings by large numbers of troops. He ordered them reinforced. Aiming to prevent any landings, and with no warships at his disposal, he equipped scores of chaloupes to defend the goulet and armed militias with weapons requisitioned by the navy. The cavalry regiments and dragoons were positioned at Landerneau and Quimper and, to enable the fast transmission of information, Vauban organised a communications code in the form of signals. In a letter to Louis XIV on 17 June 1694, he reported:

Battle

17 June 1694

The Anglo-Dutch fleet (of 36 ships of the line, 12 bomb vessels as well as 80 transport ships carrying around 8,000 soldiers<ref>We cite here the most probable numbers. Different authors cite the following estimates:
 41 ships of the line, 14 fire ships, 12 bomb vessels, 80 vaisseaux de transport (G.-G. Toduouze, Camaret, Grand'Garde du littoral de l'Armorique)
 36 ships of the line, 12 bomb vessels, 80 small ships carrying 8000 men (P. Levot, Histoire de la ville et du port de Brest)
 36 ships of the line, 12 bomb vessels (Rapin-Thoyras, Histoire d'Angleterre)
 29 sail of line, 27 frigates, bomb-ketcher, fire-ships and tenders (The United Service Journal)
 36 ships of war, without reckoning the bomb-ketches and the infernal machines (The Monthly Review''')
 36 ships of the line, 12 bomb vessels and transports carrying around 8000 soldiers (Revue maritime et coloniale)</ref>) under Berkeley finally set out and signals reached Vauban on the evening 17 June that the fleet was in the mer d'Iroise. It anchored halfway between Bertheaume and le Toulinguet near Camaret Bay, close to the mouth of Brest harbour.

Rear admiral the Marquess of Carmarthen (accompanied by John Cutts) approached the coasts to check on the French positions and possible landing places. On his return  Unknown to the English, at this point the promised French reinforcements had still not arrived and Vauban wrote the following letter to the king at 11pm on 17 June:

18 June 1694

On the morning of 18 June, a thick fog settled over this part of Brittany, blinding both sides and leading the English to postpone the attack. This aided the French "for a cavalry corps commanded by Monsieur de Cervon and part of the militia only arrived at Châteaulin at 9 o'clock". Thus it was only at around 11 o'clock, when the fog lifted, that Carmarthen could advance with eight ships to attack the Tour de Camaret and protect the 200 longboats loaded with soldiers heading for the beach at Trez-Rouz. The Tour de Camaret, supported by the batteries at Le Gouin and Tremet, brought down such fire that two ships were set on fire and the others badly damaged. Despite this surprise, the English retaliated, with several shots reaching the tower. In this encounter a cannonball shot off the top of the spire of the Chapelle Notre-Dame de Rocamadour.  Meanwhile, Tollemache landed on the beach at Trez-Rouz at the head of 1,300 men, including French Huguenots, and was met with heavy fire. Wavering for a moment, they were then charged by 100 men of independent companies and 1,200 coastguard militiamen.

Macaulay wrote in his History of England: 

Tollemache was carried back towards the squadron by one of the few longboats still afloat. The French counter-attack repulsed the enemy back to the sea, and the landing troops were unable to retreat further since the falling tide had left the longboats high and dry. Only ten of these boats were able to rejoin the rest of the English fleet.

The English losses were considerable: 

Since that date the landing beach, stained red with blood, has been known as Trez Rouz (red beach). The nearest cliff to where Talmash landed, or the battery which fired the shot that hit him, is still known as Maro ar saozon'' (the Englishman's death).

When battle was joined Vauban found himself at Fort du Mengant and only reached the battlefield itself when it was all over. In a letter to M. de Pontchartrain from Camaret on 18 June, he wrote:

Results

Talmash died of his wounds on his return in Plymouth and England public grief and indignation for the treachery were loudly expressed. After this defeat, the Anglo-Dutch fleet put about and sailed back up the English Channel, bombarding ports such as Dieppe and Le Havre in reprisal. Le Havre was severely damaged in a 5-day bombardment, from 26 to 31 July. In September, the same fleet attacked Dunkirk and Calais, but their fortifications meant they could fight off the attacks and suffered only minor damage. This attack gave Vauban the chance to fortify the coasts around Brest, installing a battery at Portzic, another on île Longue, a third at Plougastel etc...

To celebrate the victory, Louis XIV struck a medal engraved "Custos orae Armoricae" (guard of the coast of Armorica) and "Angl. et Batav. caesis et fugatis 1694" (the English and the Dutch routed and put to flight 1694). By a decision of 23 December 1697 the States of Brittany exempted the inhabitants of Camaret "fully from contributing to fouages, tailles and other taxes which arise in the other parishes of the Province of Brittany".

The "Camaret Bay letter"
Searching for a scapegoat after this bloody defeat, many accused John Churchill, disgraced around this time by William III for other reasons, of treason. He was accused of sending a letter to the deposed James II in May 1694 forewarning him of the attack on Brest. This is what came to be known as the Camaret Bay letter, and it ran as follows:

The letter only exists in a French translation and Winston Churchill claimed in his biography of Churchill (his ancestor) that it was a forgery aimed at damaging Marlborough's reputation and that the duke never betrayed William III. Even if it is practically certain that Marlborough sent a message across the Channel at the start of May describing the imminent attack on Brest, it is equally certain that the French already knew of the plans for the Brest expedition via other sources. David Chandler concluded "the whole episode is so obscure and inconclusive that it is still not possible to make a definite ruling. In sum, perhaps we should award Marlborough the benefit of the doubt".

Commemorations

In the north transept of the parish church of Saint-Rémi, partly obscured by the organ pipes, there is a large stained-glass window showing the battle, designed by Jim Sévellec.

See also

 Goulet de Brest (with links to most of the fortifications along it, many of which were built by Vauban)
 Camaret-sur-Mer
 Tour Vauban
 Combined operations and the European theatre during the Nine Years' War,  1688-97

Notes

References

External links 
 The History Of England from the Accession of James II. Chapter XX by Thomas Babington Macaulay.
 French account of the attack
  Inventaire du patrimoine de Bretagne

1694 in France
Battles of the Nine Years' War
Naval battles involving France
Naval battles involving England
Naval battles of the Nine Years' War
Attack
Conflicts in 1694